UFC 252: Miocic vs. Cormier 3 was a mixed martial arts event produced by the Ultimate Fighting Championship that took place on August 15, 2020 at the UFC Apex facility in Enterprise, Nevada, part of the Las Vegas Metropolitan Area, United States.

Background
The promotion was initially targeting another event to take place on this date at 3Arena in Dublin, Ireland. However, the organization confirmed in June that the Dublin card was indefinitely postponed due to the COVID-19 pandemic.

A UFC Heavyweight Championship trilogy between current two-time champion Stipe Miocic and former champion Daniel Cormier (also former UFC Light Heavyweight Champion) took place as the event headliner. The pairing first met at UFC 226 on July 7, 2018 where Cormier, as the light heavyweight champion, returned to heavyweight and captured the title by knocking Miocic out in the first round. Their second meeting took place at UFC 241 on August 17, 2019 where Miocic regained the belt and got his revenge via fourth-round knockout. Cormier also announced that he planned on retiring after this bout.

A bantamweight bout between Pedro Munhoz and former UFC Lightweight Champion Frankie Edgar was briefly linked to UFC 251, but promotion officials elected to schedule the pairing four days later for UFC on ESPN: Kattar vs. Ige. On July 6, it was announced that the bout between Munhoz and Edgar was scrapped after Munhoz tested positive for COVID-19. They were later rescheduled for this event. However, promotion officials then moved the pairing again to serve as the main event of UFC on ESPN: Munhoz vs. Edgar.

A light heavyweight rematch between Magomed Ankalaev and Ion Cuțelaba was expected to take place at this event. The pairing first met at UFC Fight Night: Benavidez vs. Figueiredo, where Ankalaev won via controversial knockout. The bout was originally expected to take place at UFC 249, on its original April 18 date. However, Ankalaev was forced to pull out of the event due to travel restrictions related to the COVID-19 pandemic. Cuțelaba then pulled out on August 11, as a result of testing positive for COVID-19 and the bout was rescheduled for UFC Fight Night: Smith vs. Rakić.

Rogério Bontorin was expected to face promotional newcomer Manel Kape at the event. However, Bontorin pulled out of the fight on July 22 due to an ankle injury. In turn, Kape announced his debut would be postponed and that he would not appear on the card either, also due to an ankle injury.

A light heavyweight bout between Jorge Gonzalez and Ike Villanueva was expected to take place at the event. However, due to alleged visa issues for Gonzalez, the pairing was pushed back and expected to take place a week later at UFC on ESPN: Munhoz vs. Edgar.

At the weigh-ins, Herbert Burns and T.J. Brown missed weight for their respective featherweight bouts. Burns weighed in at 149.5 pounds, three and a half pounds over the non-title fight limit. Brown weighed in at 146.5 pounds, half a pound over the non-title fight limit. Both of their bouts proceeded at a catchweight and they were each fined 20% of their individual purses, which went to their opponents Daniel Pineda and Danny Chavez.

Results

Bonus awards
The following fighters received $50,000 bonuses.
Fight of the Night: Kai Kamaka III vs. Tony Kelley
Performance of the Night: Daniel Pineda and Virna Jandiroba

See also 

 List of UFC events
 List of current UFC fighters
 2020 in UFC

References 

Ultimate Fighting Championship events
2020 in mixed martial arts
2020 in sports in Nevada
Mixed martial arts in Las Vegas
Sports competitions in Las Vegas
August 2020 sports events in the United States